John Tempesta (born September 26, 1964) is an American drummer known for his work in hard rock and heavy metal. He has been a member of the Cult since 2006.

Biography
Previously, Tempesta played with several bands including Exodus, Testament and White Zombie. He worked with former White Zombie singer Rob Zombie as a solo artist and served as drum technician for Charlie Benante, drummer for the heavy metal band Anthrax earlier in his career. He is referenced in Anthrax's rendition of "Friggin' in the Riggin'" (from their 1989 EP Penikufesin), with lyrics about the band's crew members. Additionally he also played the role of the "Not Man" during Anthrax's early live shows footage of which can be seen in the "Antisocial" music video.

In 1997 he had a brief tenure as the drummer for the band Prong before they disbanded later the same year.

In 2000, he played drums on the song "Meat", from Tony Iommi's self-titled solo album.

He played with the band Helmet in 2004–2005.

In October 2004, he recorded with the band Scum of the Earth. The band was composed of John and his brother Mike Tempesta who was formerly the guitarist of Powerman 5000, Riggs (former Rob Zombie guitarist), John Dolmayan (System of a Down), Seven, and Clay Campbell. They released Blah...Blah...Blah...Love Songs for the New Millennium, a pop-heavy release  reminiscent of the White Zombie / Rob Zombie sound, produced by Ben Burkhardt at Belt of Orion Recording in Hollywood.

On February 14, 2006, he was hired by the Cult.

In April 2011, he recorded drum samples and MIDI grooves for a Toontrack expansion to drum emulation software EZdrummer, called Metal Machine EZX.

July 15, 2013, Tempesta finished his drum recordings for the project Temple of the Black Moon, a project with well-known artists from a variety of metal genres. Other members are: Dani Filth, Rob Caggiano and King Ov Hell.  In the same year, he also drummed on Emphatic's album Another Life.

Discography

With Exodus
 Impact is Imminent (1990)
 Good Friendly Violent Fun (1991)
 Force of Habit (1992)

With Testament
 Low (1994)
 First Strike Still Deadly (2001)
 Live in London (2005)

With White Zombie
 Astro Creep: 2000 (1995)

With Rob Zombie
 Hellbilly Deluxe (1998)
 The Sinister Urge (2001)
 Past, Present & Future (2003)
 The Best of Rob Zombie (2006)

With Helmet
 Size Matters (2004)

With Scum of the Earth
 Blah...Blah...Blah...Love Songs for the New Millennium (2004)

With The Cult
 Born into This (2007)
 Capsule EPs (2010)
 Choice of Weapon (2012)
  Hidden City (2016)

With Emphatic 
 Another Life (2013)

References

External links
  John Tempesta's Official Website

American heavy metal drummers
Exodus (American band) members
The Cult members
White Zombie (band) members
American people of Italian descent
Living people
People from the Bronx
Musicians from New York City
1964 births
Helmet (band) members
American male drummers
The Dead Daisies members
Scum of the Earth (band) members
20th-century American drummers
Prong (band) members
Testament (band) members